The General Achievement Test (GAT) is an Australian test of general knowledge and skills including communication, mathematics, science and technology, the arts, humanities and social sciences.

From 2022, the GAT is delivered in two sections, held as two separate tests on the same day. Section A assesses literacy and numeracy. Section B assesses mathematics, science, technology, the arts and humanities. All senior secondary students in Victoria, including Senior VCAL students, sit Section A. All students enrolled in one or more VCE Unit 3–4 subject (including scored VCE VET) sit Sections A and B.

Section A is a two hour Literacy and Numeracy test with 15 minutes reading time. It includes 100 multiple choice questions (50 for Literacy and 50 for Numeracy), and two Literacy writing tasks. Section B is a 1.5 hour General Knowledge and Skills test with 15 minutes reading time. It includes 50 multiple choice questions and one writing task.

Although the GAT is not a part of the graduation requirements and does not count towards a student's final VCE results or ATAR, the GAT plays an important role in checking that a school's assessments and examinations have been accurately assessed.

Year 12 Western Australian students sat the GAT for a short period. This test was introduced into Western Australia as a trial to provide schools with feedback on the standard of assessment used for the new WACE courses. The GAT in Western Australia was however abandoned after the trial period and is no longer used.

In 2007, Monash University began taking the GAT into consideration for middle band students. It was initially for Victorian students who missed out on courses because their ATAR score was just below the cut-off score. Currently, it is only considered if two students have the same ATAR, prerequisite study scores and are trying to get into the same course. Their GAT score can then be used to differentiate between one getting in and the other not.

GATchphrase
In 2009, a student-organised movement headed by Lucas Shipsides and fuelled by Facebook brought the GAT to the attention of the national press, by suggesting that students make as many references to actor George Clooney as possible in their answers. This became known as 'Project Clooney '09'. Over 8,000 students are believed to have participated in the statewide prank/meme.

After this level of participation was observed, it became customary, as a form of parody/protest, to incorporate GAT catch phrases, or GATchphrases in the test in following years. Each year, an event is started on Facebook that gains popularity and is promoted to be used by students state-wide. Recent years have included Nic Nat in the GAT (2013), Schapelle Corby (2014) and The Cat in the Hat in the GAT (2015). In late April 2016 a poll was held on the VCE Discussion Space Facebook group to choose the "Gatchphrase" for that year. Over 1,500 votes were cast, with the theme of Shannon Noll was robbed of the 2003 Australian Idol title winning with over 1,000 votes. A public Facebook event page was created for the theme, and by the date of the GAT it had an attendance of over 3,600 students.

References

External links
 GAT on the VCAA website

Education in Victoria (Australia)
Education in Western Australia
Standardised tests in Australia
Australian Certificate of Education